Isaya Mukirania (also spelled Isaya Mukirane), known by his royal title Kibanzanga I, was the leader of the Rwenzururu movement and the first Omusinga (king) of the Kingdom of Rwenzururu. He was formally succeeded by his son Charles Mumbere over 43 years after his death, on 19 October 2009.

Isaya died on 02 September 1966. He was burried on Bulemba peak with in the Rwenzori Mountains.

References

1966 deaths
20th-century monarchs in Africa
History of Uganda
Kingdom of Rwenzururu
Rwenzori Mountains
Year of birth missing
Date of birth missing
Place of birth missing
Place of death missing